European Union Force RD Congo, commonly referred as EUFOR RD Congo, was a European Union deployment in 2006 in the Democratic Republic of the Congo. On 25 April 2006, the United Nations Security Council adopted Resolution 1671 (2006), authorising the temporary deployment of a European Union force to support the United Nations Mission in the Democratic Republic of Congo (MONUC) during the period encompassing the general elections in the DR Congo, which began on 30 July 2006.

The European Council approved the launching of the EU military operation and appointed Lieutenant General Karlheinz Viereck (Germany) Operation Commander and Major General Christian Damay (France) EU Force Commander. The Operational Headquarters was the German-nominated Armed Forces Operational Command - Einsatzführungskommando - (:de:Einsatzführungskommando der Bundeswehr) at Potsdam, Germany.

The mission was tasked with:

 supporting and providing security to MONUC installations and personnel;
 contributing to airport protection in Kinshasa;
 contributing to the protection of civilians under imminent threat of physical violence;
 evacuation operations in case of emergency.

The mission came to an end on 30 November 2006.

See also 
 List of military and civilian missions of the European Union
 Transitional Government of the Democratic Republic of the Congo

Notes and references 

Military ground operations of the European Union
International law enforcement organizations
Military history of the Democratic Republic of the Congo
2006 in the Democratic Republic of the Congo